Sparf v. United States, 156 U.S. 51 (1895), or Sparf and Hansen v. United States, was a United States Supreme Court case testing the admissibility of confessions by multiple defendants accused of the same crime, and the responsibility of juries.

Background
On the night of January 13, 1884, on a voyage to Tahiti, the second mate, a man called Maurice Fitzgerald, of the Hesper was found to be missing. It was believed that he had been killed and his body thrown overboard. The ship's captain, Sodergren, suspected three men, the crew members St. Clair, Hansen, and Sparf, of being participants in the murder. Sodergren kept the three suspects in holding until they arrived in Tahiti, where they were taken ashore by the United States consul at that island and were subsequently sent, with others, to San Francisco, on the vessel Tropic Bird. There they were tried for the murder of Fitzgerald and convicted.

Decision

The Court issued its decision on January 21, 1895 by a 5-4 vote, with Justice Harlan giving the majority opinion.

Confessions with multiple defendants
The court held that if one of two persons, accused of having together committed the crime of murder, makes a voluntary confession in the presence of the other, without threat or coercion, the confession is admissible in evidence against both. However,  declarations of one accomplice after the killing made in the absence of the other implicating the guilt of both are admissible in evidence only against the one making the declarations, not against the other.

Responsibility of juries
Sparf v. United States clarified several questions relating to the duty of federal criminal juries, and of federal courts when instructing them.
 It is the duty of a jury to apply the law as given by the court to the facts of a case.
 A court may lay out the legal implications following from a set of facts, but it may not direct the jury to return a guilty verdict.
 A jury may, on the basis of evidence, convict of a lesser offense whose elements are included in another offense.
 In a trial for a person accused of murder, if evidence does not support conviction for a lesser offense, then the court may instruct the jury to consider guilt only for the offenses that have been charged. It is then the duty of the jury to do so.

Justice Harlan, in his decision, quoted Kane v. Com., 1 Cr. Law Mag. 51, 56:"'... We must hold, to enable us to avoid the inconsistency, that, subject to the qualification that all acquittals are final, the law in criminal cases is to be determined by the court. In this way we have our liberties and rights determined, not by an irresponsible, but by a responsible, tribunal; not by a tribunal ignorant of the law, but by a tribunal trained to and disciplined by the law; not by an irreversible tribunal, but by a reversible tribunal; not by a tribunal which makes its own law, but by a tribunal that obeys the law as made. In this way we maintain two fundamental maxims. The first is that, while juries answer facts, the court answers the laws. The second, which is still more important, is ‘Nullum crimen, nulla poena, sine lege.’ Unless there is a violation of law preannounced, and this by a constant and responsible tribunal, there is no crime, and can be no punishment.' We must therefore accept that the jury are no more judges of law in criminal than in civil cases, with the qualification that, owing to the peculiar doctrine of autrefois acquit, a criminal acquittal by a jury cannot be overhauled by the court.’"Sparf remains the last direct opinion of the Court on jury nullification. While it does not prohibit juries from disputing the law in a case, it denies them any right to do so.

See also
 List of United States Supreme Court cases, volume 156
Jury nullification

References

External links
 
 

United States Supreme Court cases
1895 in United States case law
United States Supreme Court cases of the Fuller Court
United States jury case law
Jury nullification